David Anzorovich Khubayev (born 1 October 1994) is a Russian football midfielder. He plays for FC Neftekhimik Nizhnekamsk.

Club career
He made his debut in the Russian Second Division for FC Gubkin on 31 July 2012 in a game against FC Vityaz Podolsk.

He made his Russian Football National League debut for FC Sokol Saratov on 6 July 2014 in a game against FC Yenisey Krasnoyarsk.

References

External links
 
 

1994 births
Sportspeople from Saratov
Living people
Russian footballers
Association football midfielders
FC Sokol Saratov players
FC KAMAZ Naberezhnye Chelny players
FC Neftekhimik Nizhnekamsk players
Russian First League players
Russian Second League players